Anastasia Aleksandrovna Abrosimova (born 17 July 1990) is a Russian triathlete. She won the 2015 ITU Aquathlon World Championships. The following year, she competed in the women's event at the 2016 Summer Olympics.

References

External links
 

1990 births
Living people
Russian female triathletes
People from Verkhnebureinsky District
Triathletes at the 2016 Summer Olympics
Olympic triathletes of Russia
Triathletes at the 2015 European Games
European Games competitors for Russia
Sportspeople from Khabarovsk Krai
21st-century Russian women